Queen & Slim: The Soundtrack is the soundtrack to Melina Matsoukas' 2019 film Queen & Slim. It was released on November 15, 2019, through Motown Records.

Track listing

Queen & Slim: The Soundtrack

Notes
 signifies a vocal producer

Queen & Slim (Original Motion Picture Score)

Accolades

Charts

References 

2019 soundtrack albums
Motown soundtracks
Albums produced by Hit-Boy
Albums produced by Dev Hynes
Albums produced by Lauryn Hill
Albums produced by Syd tha Kyd
Albums produced by Raphael Saadiq
Crime film soundtracks
Drama film soundtracks